Stephen James Mangan (born 16 May 1968) is an English actor, comedian, presenter and writer. He has played Guy Secretan in Green Wing, Dan Moody in I'm Alan Partridge, Seán Lincoln in Episodes, Bigwig in Watership Down, Postman Pat in Postman Pat: The Movie, Richard Pitt in Hang Ups, Andrew in Bliss (2018), and Nathan Stern in The Split (2018–2022).

As a stage actor, he was Tony-nominated for his portrayal of Norman in The Norman Conquests on Broadway. He starred as Bertie Wooster in Jeeves and Wooster in Perfect Nonsense at the Duke of York's Theatre in the West End, which won the 2014 Olivier Award for Best New Comedy. He co-presented the 2020 edition of Children In Need for the BBC.

Early life and education
Mangan was born in Ponders End, in Enfield, north London, to Irish parents. He has two sisters, Anita and Lisa.

Mangan was educated at two private schools, Lochinver House School for boys in Potters Bar, and Haileybury and Imperial Service College (now co-educational), a boarding school in the village of Hertford Heath, Hertfordshire. He was in a school prog rock band called Aragon, who recorded an album called The Wizard's Dream.

After earning a Bachelor of Arts in law at Gonville and Caius College, Cambridge, Mangan took a year out to care for his mother, Mary, who died of colon cancer at age 45. Weeks after her death, he auditioned for the Royal Academy of Dramatic Art and went on to study there for three years. His father, James, died of a brain tumour at age 63. Mangan backed the 2020 National Brain Appeal's a charity supporting research at the National Brain Hospital, with a unique online art gallery exhibition sale.

Career

Theatre
After graduating from RADA in 1994, Mangan did not pursue lead roles on screen, preferring to take what he saw as the less limited opportunities on the stage. Between 1994 and 2000, he performed in plays throughout the UK and the West End before joining the theatre company Cheek by Jowl for an international tour of Much Ado About Nothing, earning him a nomination for a National Theatre Ian Charleson Award. He worked again for director Declan Donnellan at the Royal Shakespeare Company in School for Scandal, and at the Savoy Theatre in Hay Fever.

In 2008 he played the title role in The Norman Conquests, directed by Matthew Warchus, at The Old Vic and then at the Circle in the Square on Broadway. The production was a huge critical success earning several Tony Award nominations, including one for Mangan himself and won the Tony Award for Best Revival.

In 2012 he appeared at the Royal Court in a Joe Penhall play, Birthday, directed by Roger Michell, playing a pregnant man.

Mangan starred as Bertie Wooster in Jeeves and Wooster in Perfect Nonsense at the Duke of York's Theatre alongside Matthew Macfadyen as Jeeves from October 2013 until they were replaced by Mark Heap and Robert Webb in April 2014. The production won the 2014 Laurence Olivier Award for Best New Comedy.

Television
Mangan's breakthrough television performance was as Adrian Mole in the six-part BBC TV show series Adrian Mole: The Cappuccino Years in 2001. That same year he appeared in Sword of Honour on Channel 4, alongside Daniel Craig.

In 2002, he appeared as Dan Moody in the I'm Alan Partridge episode "Bravealan". A scene where Alan repeatedly shouts "Dan!" at Dan from a distance in a car park, while Dan seems not to notice him, was named the second best moment from the series by Metro, and in 2014 Mangan said that he has "Dan!" shouted at him by passers-by almost every day.

Mangan played Guy Secretan in the BAFTA-winning British sitcom Green Wing. In Channel 4's The World's Greatest Comedy Characters, Guy was voted 34th. He starred as Keith in Never Better, a British television sitcom on BBC Two. He plays a recovering alcoholic Keith Merchant and Kate Ashfield is his long-suffering wife Anita. The series was written by Fintan Ryan for World Productions.

In 2009, Free Agents, a romantic black comedy starred Mangan, Sharon Horgan and Anthony Head. Originally a pilot for Channel 4 in November 2007, the series began on 13 February 2009. It spawned a short lived US remake, which was cancelled after just four episodes aired, although four more were later released on Hulu.

He played the title role in Dirk Gently, a British comedy detective drama TV series based on characters from the Dirk Gently novels by Douglas Adams. The series was created by Howard Overman and co-starred Darren Boyd as his sidekick Richard MacDuff. Recurring actors included Helen Baxendale as MacDuff's girlfriend Susan Harmison, Jason Watkins as Dirk's nemesis DI Gilks and Lisa Jackson as Dirk's receptionist Janice Pearce. Unlike most detective series Dirk Gently featured broadly comic touches and even some science fiction themes such as time travel and artificial intelligence. He has said that he was "bitterly upset" at the BBC's axing of the series after four episodes due to a freeze on the licence fee. The four episodes of Dirk Gently were later released on the BritBox streaming service.

He played the title role in "The Hunt for Tony Blair", a one-off episode of The Comic Strip Presents..., a British television comedy, which was first shown on Channel 4 on 14 October 2011. The 60-minute film was written by Peter Richardson and Pete Richens and presented in the style of a 1950s film noir. It stars Mangan as the former British Prime Minister Tony Blair, who is wanted for murder and on the run as a fugitive. The film received its world premiere at the Edinburgh International Television Festival in August 2011. It first aired on Channel 4 on 14 October 2011; it received a mostly positive reaction from reviewers, and was nominated for a BAFTA award (Best Comedy Programme 2012) and the British Comedy Awards (Best Comedy Drama 2011).

He appeared in Episodes, a British/American television comedy series created by David Crane and Jeffrey Klarik and produced by Hat Trick Productions. It premiered on Showtime in the United States on 9 January 2011 at 9:30 pm and on BBC Two in the UK on 10 January 2011.

The show is about a British husband-and-wife comedy writing team who travel to Hollywood to remake their successful British TV series, with disastrous results. Mangan based his performance as Lincoln on his favorite shows from his youth. On 11 December 2013, it was announced that Showtime had renewed Episodes for a fourth season. Episodes has received positive reviews by critics, with many singling out Mangan, Tamsin Greig, and Matt LeBlanc's performances.

In 2018, Mangan played the lead role in a black comedy TV series Bliss, created by American comedian David Cross, which was aired on Sky One and released by the BritBox streaming service. Bliss stars Mangan as Andrew, a fraudulent travel writer, who is struggling to maintain long-term relationships with two partners, Kim (Heather Graham) and Denise (Jo Hartley), who are not aware of one another.

He co-wrote and starred in Hang Ups for Channel 4. The show had an all-star cast, including David Tennant, Katherine Parkinson, Charles Dance and Richard E. Grant. It received rave reviews and was nominated for two major awards.

Also in 2018, Mangan starred in the BBC legal drama The Split opposite Nicola Walker. He reprised this role in the second series in 2020 and again in the third series in 2022.

In 2020 he co-hosted BBC Children in Need alongside Mel Giedroyc, Alex Scott and Chris Ramsey. He also served as the narrator of ITV's documentary series Who Wants to Be a Millionaire?: The Million Pound Question, which started airing in November 2020.

In May 2022 the BBC announced that Mangan would be one of the guest presenters to take over Richard Osman's role on Pointless.

Film

Mangan's first film part was as Doctor Crane in Billy Elliot, which was released in 2000. In 2001 he appeared in the Miramax film Birthday Girl, starring Nicole Kidman and Vincent Cassel; in the same year he appeared as French cabaret singer Pierre Dupont in the cult film Chunky Monkey alongside David Threlfall and Alison Steadman. In 2002, he appeared opposite Keira Knightley in the short New Year's Eve.

He played the leading role in 2003's SuperTex, a Dutch film directed by Jan Schütte and filmed in English. In 2005 he played a comedian in Festival, a British black comedy film about a number of people at the Edinburgh Festival Fringe, directed by Annie Griffin. The general shots of the festival were filmed during the 2004 event. Mangan was nominated for a Scottish BAFTA for his performance.

Confetti, a 2006 British mockumentary romantic comedy film, was released on 5 May 2006. It was conceived and directed by Debbie Isitt and stars many British comedians, including Jessica Stevenson, Jimmy Carr, Martin Freeman, Mark Heap, Julia Davis, Robert Webb, and Olivia Colman. It follows a bridal magazine competition for the most original wedding, the ultimate prize being a house, and the three couples who are chosen to compete. Mangan plays one of the grooms, a professional tennis player.

He starred in Beyond the Pole, a 2010 British mockumentary adapted from the cult BBC radio series of the same name. It received its UK cinema release in 2010. It was directed and produced by David L. Williams. The film was shot on floating sea ice off the coast of Greenland, and stars an acclaimed cast of actors and comedians including Mangan, Rhys Thomas, Mark Benton, Alexander Skarsgard and Helen Baxendale. Variety magazine described the film as a cross between The Office and Touching the Void.

In 2013 Mangan played Alastair Caldwell in Rush, a British-German biographical sports drama film centered on the rivalry between race car drivers James Hunt and Niki Lauda during the 1976 Formula One motor-racing season. It was written by Peter Morgan, directed by Ron Howard and stars Chris Hemsworth as Hunt and Daniel Brühl as Lauda. The film premiered in London on 2 September 2013 and was shown at the 2013 Toronto International Film Festival before its UK and US theatrical releases on, respectively, 13 and 20 September 2013.

In 2014, Mangan voiced the title role in Postman Pat: The Movie, a British 3D computer-animated comedy film featuring Postman Pat, star of a long-running BBC children's series.  It was originally due to be released on 24 May 2013, but was pushed back to a year later. Pat's singing voice was performed by Ronan Keating.  Other voice actors in the film included Jim Broadbent, Rupert Grint, and David Tennant.

In 2020, it was announced Mangan is to write his first film, an adaptation of the children’s novel Harry And The Wrinklies.

Other
Mangan was host of the Evening Standard British Film Awards for four years (2009–2013). On 27 April 2014, he returned to host the British Academy Television Craft Awards in London for a third time. Mangan recorded the role of Cloten in Shakespeare's Cymbeline for the Arkangel Shakespeare audiobook series, directed by Clive Brill. Mangan has been one of the hosts of Artist of the Year since 2018.

Personal life
Mangan is married to actress Louise Delamere. They have three sons: Harry (born October 2007), Frank (born 2010), and Jack (born March 2016)

He is a fan of Tottenham Hotspur and goes to games with Tamsin Greig's husband Richard Leaf.

In August 2014, Mangan was one of 200 public figures who were signatories to a letter to The Guardian expressing their hope that Scotland would vote to remain part of the United Kingdom in September's referendum on that issue.

Filmography

Film

Television

Theatre

Radio

Notes

References

External links

Agent's page on Stephen Mangan
Green Wing "microsite" at Channel4.com

Interviews and articles
The Observer Interview - The new face of grown-up Adrian Mole (21 January 2001)
BBC article on Adrian Mole - the Cappuccino Years
Green Wing Interview on T4 (Channel 4) March 2006
Telegraph Magazine article 18 March 2006
Evening Standard article 20 April 2006 entitled Comedy's Hottest Property
Times article 6 May 2006 entitled Nicer than he looks on TV
Sunday Times "He’s earned his wings" interview with Stephen Mangan, 9 July 2006
Stephen Mangan hands out his very own BAFTAs, Bafta.org 4 March 2009
Interview with Stephen Mangan on Broadway.com May 2009

1968 births
Living people
20th-century English male actors
21st-century English male actors
Alumni of Gonville and Caius College, Cambridge
Alumni of RADA
English atheists
English male film actors
English male radio actors
English male Shakespearean actors
English male stage actors
English male television actors
English people of Irish descent
Former Roman Catholics
Male actors from London
People educated at Haileybury and Imperial Service College
People educated at Lochinver House School
People from Ponders End
People from Winchmore Hill
Royal Shakespeare Company members